TCR gamma alternate reading frame protein, also known as TARP, is a human gene.

In some non-lymphoid tissues, the unrearranged T cell receptor gamma (TRG@) locus is expressed. The resulting transcript contains a subset of the TRG@ gene segments and is shorter than TRG@ transcripts expressed in lymphoid tissues. 

This RefSeq record represents the unrearranged TRG@ locus transcript; the complete TRG@ locus is represented by the genomic RefSeq NG_001336. The transcript represented by this RefSeq has two open reading frames (ORFs) that encode different proteins. The downstream ORF is in the same frame as TRG@ and its protein product is similar to TRG@ proteins. The upstream ORF uses a different reading frame and encodes a novel protein.

References

Further reading